Ernesto Duarte Machado da Silva (born 30 September 1900, date of death unknown), known as just Machado, was a Brazilian footballer. He played in three matches for the Brazil national football team in 1921. He was also part of Brazil's squad for the 1921 South American Championship.

References

External links
 

1900 births
Year of death missing
Brazilian footballers
Brazil international footballers
Place of birth missing
Association footballers not categorized by position